Clondagad is a civil parish of County Clare, Ireland. Clondagad House is a three-bay two-storey house dated to around 1820.

Geography
The civil parish of Clondagad is in the southern part of the county and is bordered by Kilmaley to the north, Killone to the northeast, Kilchreest to the southeast, Kilfiddane to the southwest, and Kilmikil to the west. It is divided into 25 townlands:
  

Ballycloghessy
Ballycorick 
Beneden 	
Breaghva 
Caherea
Cappanageeragh 
Clooncolman 
Cloondrinagh 
Cloonmore 	
Cragbrien
Craggykerrivan 	
Dehomad 	
Drumquin 	
Furroor 	
Gortnamuck
Gortygeeheen 
Inishaellaun
Knockalehid 	
Lanna 	
Lavally (North)
Lavally (South) 
Liscasey 
Lisheen 	
Lismorris 
Toberaniddaun

See also
List of townlands of County Clare

References

Civil parishes of County Clare